Nathan Derry (born 15 January 1987 in Gorleston, Norfolk) is an English darts player who competes in Professional Darts Corporation events.

Career
Derry won a two-year PDC Pro Tour card in January 2015 on the last day of the PDC's Q School. He qualified for the UK Open and beat Alan Tabern 5–4 and Keegan Brown 9–2 to reach the fourth round, where he led Mervyn King 8–5, but would lose 9–8. In the first Players Championship of the year he threw a nine-dart finish in the opening round during a 6–5 defeat to Darren Johnson. Derry's first European Tour event was the Gibraltar Darts Trophy and he overcame Andy Parsons 6–3 and Ian White 6–1 with an average of 100.29 and 100% checkout percentage. In the third round he was beaten 6–3 by Jelle Klaasen.

Derry lost 6–3 to Ryan de Vreede in the first round of the 2016 UK Open. He won the Bucks Easter Open by seeing off Martin Lukeman in the final. Derry qualified for the Grand Slam of Darts and narrowly beat Alan Norris 5–4, before being thrashed 5–0 by reigning world champion Gary Anderson. He needed to defeat BDO number one Glen Durrant to progress through to the knockout stage, but lost 5–0.

In January 2019, Derry attended PDC UK Q-School and gained a two-year PDC Tour Card on the fourth and final day after previous disappointing results. He also changed his nickname from "The Firework" to "Slingshot".

References

External links

1987 births
Living people
English darts players
People from Gorleston-on-Sea
Professional Darts Corporation former tour card holders
21st-century English people